Cornufer pelewensis, commonly known as Palau frog or Palau wrinkled ground frog, is a species of frog in the family Ceratobatrachidae.
It is endemic to Palau.

Its natural habitats are subtropical or tropical dry forests, subtropical or tropical moist lowland forests, subtropical or tropical mangrove forests, dry savanna, moist savanna, subtropical or tropical dry shrubland, subtropical or tropical moist shrubland, rocky areas, caves, plantations, rural gardens, urban areas, heavily degraded former forest, and man-made karsts.

References

Fauna of Micronesia
pelewensis
Endemic fauna of Palau
Taxonomy articles created by Polbot
Amphibians described in 1867
Taxa named by Wilhelm Peters